{{album ratings
|rev1 = AllMusic
|rev1score = 
|rev2 = Chronicles of Chaos
|rev2score = 6.5/10
|rev3 = The Encyclopedia of Popular Music'
|rev3score = 
}}Superholic is the second album by the heavy metal supergroup Engine. It was released on May 21, 2002, on Metal Blade Records. This was the band's final album, as the members returned to their main projects.

Critical reception
AllMusic wrote: "The quality is on par with the previous effort, however, in that a few good moments -- the best of which is 'Fascination Street,' a moody, simmering number that has the most soul of anything present here -- intertwine with a sizable amount of filler." The Encyclopedia of Popular Music'' wrote that the album "saw the band take even more chances musically."

Track listing

References

2002 albums
Engine (American band) albums